Dahlen is a census-designated place and an unincorporated community in Nelson County, North Dakota, United States. It was designated as part of the United States Census Bureau's Participant Statistical Areas Program on March 31, 2010. It was not counted separately during the 2000 census, but was included in the 2010 census, where a population of 18 was reported. The population was 17 at the 2020 census.

The tower is used by television station WDAZ of Grand Forks. The tower was also used by KGFE of Grand Forks until an ice storm damaged equipment in 2004.

Demographics

References

Census-designated places in North Dakota
Census-designated places in Nelson County, North Dakota
Unincorporated communities in North Dakota
Unincorporated communities in Nelson County, North Dakota